Valery Vladimirovich Miloserdov   (August 11, 1951 – January 26, 2015) was a Russian basketball player who competed for the Soviet Union in the 1976 Summer Olympics and the 1980 Summer Olympics and won bronze medals.

References

1951 births
Soviet men's basketball players
1974 FIBA World Championship players
Russian men's basketball players
Olympic basketball players of the Soviet Union
Basketball players at the 1976 Summer Olympics
Basketball players at the 1980 Summer Olympics
Olympic bronze medalists for the Soviet Union
Olympic medalists in basketball
2015 deaths
Medalists at the 1980 Summer Olympics
Medalists at the 1976 Summer Olympics
FIBA World Championship-winning players
PBC CSKA Moscow players
People from Elektrostal
Sportspeople from Moscow Oblast